Akadimia, literally "Academy", is a neighborhood in central Athens, Greece.

Located directly north and slight west of Syntagma Square, it is bounded by Akadimias Street, Panepistimiou Street, Solonos Street and Stadiou Street. It is named after the Academy of Athens, since this was the first educational building to be built there in 1859. One of the busiest areas of Athens, many important buildings are found here.

The Panepistimio metro station serves Line 2 of the Athens Metro, while there is a tram stop at Plateia Klafthmonos.

Notable buildings
 Academy of Athens
 Athens Law School
 Catholic Church of Agios Dionysios
 Central Offices of the Bank of Greece
 Council of State
 Eye Hospital
 National and Kapodistrian University of Athens
 National Library of Greece
 State Legal Council

Neighbourhoods in Athens